The following lists events that happened during 1960 in Ethiopia.

Incumbents
 Emperor: Haile Selassie I
 Prime Minister: Abebe Aregai (until 17 December), Imru Haile Selassie (17 December-20 December)

Events

July
 July 10 - The Eritrean Liberation Front was founded, with the goal of liberating Eritrea from the rule of Ethiopia.

December
 December 13 - While Emperor Haile Selassie I of Ethiopia was visiting Brazil, his Imperial Bodyguard staged a coup d'etat, taking many of the Imperial staff hostage, including Crown Prince Asfa Wossen, who was proclaimed as King (rather than Emperor). The coup failed within a few days, and Haile Selassie reigned as emperor until another coup in 1974.

References

 
1960s in Ethiopia
Ethiopia
Ethiopia
Years of the 20th century in Ethiopia